The Esso Northumbria was the first of a series of Very Large Crude Carrier ships, built by Swan Hunter at Wallsend on Tyneside, in 1969. When launched on 2 May 1969 by Princess Anne it was the largest vessel to have been built in Britain at that time.

The ship was designed to carry crude oil from the Persian Gulf, and its large design was a result of the Suez Crisis, which had resulted in the closing of the Suez Canal. The ship was single-hulled and was designed with relatively limited knowledge of the behaviours of such large structures at sea, being generally a straightforward scaling-up of a smaller design. It was also built to a fixed-price contract at a time when rampant inflation was occurring in Britain. This led to many attempts to cut costs; Swan Hunter ultimately made a loss on the contract. Final cost of the ship was £6.5 million.

The ship was plagued with problems both with its fittings and more seriously, with cracking of the hull under stress. It needed many repairs in its short working lifetime and this, together with fears of a major spill, prompted its retirement in 1982 after only 12 years in service. The ship was broken up at Kaohsiung, Taiwan. A similar fate befell its sister ship, the Esso Hibernia, also built on Tyneside and launched in 1970.

In popular culture

 In the 1971 feature film Get Carter starring Michael Caine, the Esso Hibernia appeared in the background of the famous shootout scene by the docks.
 In 2019 The Dreadnoughts released Roll Northumbria, which details an alternate version of the Northumbria's short lifespan, where the cracks in the hull cause an oil spill.

References

External links
 

Oil tankers
Ships built by Swan Hunter
Ships built on the River Tyne
Ships of ExxonMobil
1969 ships